The men's 50 metre butterfly at the 2007 World Aquatics Championships took place on 25 March (heats, a swim-off, and semifinals) and on the evening of 26 March (final) at Rod Laver Arena in Melbourne, Australia. 160 swimmers were entered in the event, of which 152 swam.

Existing records at the start of the event were:
World record (WR): 22.96, Roland Schoeman (South Africa), 25 July 2005 in Montreal, Canada.
Championship record (CR): 22.96, Roland Schoeman (South Africa), Montreal 2005 (25 July 2005)

Results

Final

Semifinals

A swim-off for 8th place should have occurred between Jakob Andkjær and Lyndon Ferns who tied for 8th at 23.99; however, results from a semifinal swim-off in the event are not on the OmegaTiming site, nor in the "complete" result page. Andkjær did advance to the finals, as he swam there, and Ferns did not.

Heats
Heat 1

Heat 2

Heat 3

Heat 4

Heat 5

Heat 6

Heat 7

Heat 8

Heat 9

Heat 10

Heat 11

Heat 12

Heat 13

Heat 14

Heat 15

Heat 16

Heat 17

Heat 18

Heat 19

Heat 20

Swim-off for 16th place
Following the conclusion of the preliminary heats there was a three-way tie in for 16th at 24.06 between Germany's Thomas Rupprath, and Slovenia's two entries in the event: Peter Mankoč and Jernej Godec. 
1 Jernej Godec, Slovenia – 23.74 (Q)
1 Peter Mankoč, Slovenia – 23.74  (Q)
3 Thomas Rupprath, Germany – 23.90

As France's Frédérick Bousquet scratched the final, a swim-off to the swim-off tie was not need, and both Godec and Mankoč advanced to the semifinals.

See also
Swimming at the 2005 World Aquatics Championships – Men's 50 metre butterfly
Swimming at the 2009 World Aquatics Championships – Men's 50 metre butterfly

References

Men's 50m Fly Heats results from the 2007 World Championships. Published by OmegaTiming.com (official timer of the '07 Worlds); retrieved 2009-07-11.
Men's 50m Fly Heats swim-off results (for 16th place in semis) from the 2007 World Championships. Published by OmegaTiming.com (official timer of the '07 Worlds); retrieved 2009-07-11.
Men's 50m Fly Semifinals results from the 2007 World Championships. Published by OmegaTiming.com (official timer of the '07 Worlds); retrieved 2009-07-11.
Men's 50m Fly Final results from the 2007 World Championships. Published by OmegaTiming.com (official timer of the '07 Worlds); retrieved 2009-07-11.

Men's 50 metre butterfly
Swimming at the 2007 World Aquatics Championships